"Cuz I Can" is the third single by Swedish pop rock singer Ana Johnsson released from her first studio album, Cuz I Can. The single was released only in Sweden in 2004.

After Johnsson obtained recognition from her worldwide hit single "We Are", she decided to re-release the song. In 2005, the song was re-mixed as "Coz I Can" and released as the third and final single from Ana Johnsson's worldwide first studio album, The Way I Am. This version charted within the top 75 in Germany and was also released in Japan.

Lyrical content
Ana Johnsson quotes:

Track listings

"Cuz I Can"
CD single
 "Cuz I Can" – 3:04
 "Bring It On" – 2:45
 "Cuz I Can" (alternative mix) – 2:39

"Coz I Can"
German Pock It! CD single
 "Coz I Can" – 3:02
 "Tame Me" – 3:33

Japanese single
 "Coz I Can" – 3:02
 "We Are" (video version) – 3:54

International maxi-CD single
 "Coz I Can" – 3:02
 "Tame Me" – 3:33
 "Just a Girl" – 3:22
 "Coz I Can" (video)
 "Coz I Can" (making of the video)
 Gallery

Charts

References

Ana Johnsson songs
2004 singles
2004 songs
2005 singles
Bonnier Music singles
Epic Records singles
Song recordings produced by Ghost (production team)
Songs written by Johan Ekhé
Songs written by Ulf Lindström